Prionurus biafraensis is a tropical fish found in coral reefs in the eastern Atlantic ocean. It is commonly known as the Biafra doctorfish. It is commercial in fisheries.

References

Prionurus
Fish described in 1961